Hero Ibrahim Ahmed (born 12 June 1948) is the former First Lady of Iraq and the widow of Jalal Talabani.

Early life

She was born on 12 June 1948 to an active political family that was struggling against Kurdish oppression in Iraq. Her father, Ibrahim Ahmad was imprisoned at Abu Graib in the 1950s which motivated her to follow politics.

Her family was exiled to Kirkuk in 1954 and placed under house arrest until their return to Silemani in 1953. Upon returning her father was wounded in an assassination attempt.

Her family moved to Baghdad in 1958, where Hero pursued an education. She couldn't finish her education because of a military coup in Iraq which forced her family to flee to Iran, where she again resumed her education. In 1972 she graduated from Al-Mustansiriya University, Baghdad in Psychology, and gave birth to her eldest son Bafil.

Career
She is active in the media and is the founder of one of the major Kurdish TV Channel - Kurdsat TV.

She is a member and the de facto leader of the Patriotic Union of Kurdistan politburo after being elected in the PUK 3rd congress in June 2010.

She actively promotes art and culture and has been instrumental in supporting the younger generation artists. Being a musician herself, Hero has supported several music projects, both for fund raising and for the media, and is committed to continuing her support in the future. Hero is also a women's right activist promoting music and art. She used the Kurdsat TV channel to launch multiple women awareness projects.

Hero is currently the director of Kurdistan Save the Children (KSC) a charity organisation that aims to provide food, shelter and education for thousands of displaced orphans. She recognised that at that time a grassroots Kurdish organization was very much needed, as the involvement of local staff would ensure a better understanding of people's needs.

On 4 May 2008, while travelling to a cultural festival in Baghdad's National Theatre, a bomb exploded near her motorcade. Four of her bodyguards were injured, however Hero was not. It was unclear if Hero was the target of the bombing. This occurred on the same day as four U.S. marines were killed in Anbar Province by a roadside bomb.

She is the sister of Shanaz Ibrahim Ahmed, wife of Iraqi President Abdul Latif Rashid.

References

1948 births
Living people
Iraqi Kurdistani politicians
Patriotic Union of Kurdistan politicians
Al-Mustansiriya University alumni
21st-century Kurdish women politicians